Lee Gwang-jae (born 25 September 1941) is a South Korean gymnast who competed in eight events at the 1964 Summer Olympics.

References

1941 births
Living people
South Korean male artistic gymnasts
Olympic gymnasts of South Korea
Gymnasts at the 1964 Summer Olympics
Place of birth missing (living people)